Romildo Vitor Gomes Ferreira Neto, commonly known as Vitor and previously Romildinho is a Brazilian footballer who plays as an attacking midfielder for Treze. He played at the Brazilian national league level for Mogi Mirim in 2014 and 2015.

He is related to both Rivaldo and Rivaldinho.

Career history
Vitor came through the youth ranks of Mogi Mirim, where he played in the Under 15 team as a 13 year old. He made his professional debut for the team as a 16 year-old, on 17 August 2014 in a 2014 Campeonato Brasileiro Série C game against Duque de Caxias. Under contract with Mogi Mirim until 2017, his uncle negotiated a move to Flamengo in June 2016, where he would be part of the U20 set-up, initially.

Vitor moved to be part of the U19 set-up at Figueirense in 2017, and spent time with Sampaio Corrêa in 2019 before moving to Morocco with SCC Mohammédia. He signed for Treze Futebol Clube in April 2021.

Personal life
Vitor is the nephew of Rivaldo, and therefore cousin of Rivaldinho. The stadium of Mogi Mirim, Estádio Vail Chaves, where he made his professional debut, was at the time called Estádio Romildo Vitor Gomes Ferreira, after his grandfather.

Notes

References

External links
 

Living people
1997 births
Brazilian footballers
Association football midfielders
Mogi Mirim Esporte Clube players
CR Flamengo footballers
Figueirense FC players
Sampaio Corrêa Futebol Clube players
SCC Mohammédia players
Treze Futebol Clube players
Campeonato Brasileiro Série B players
Campeonato Brasileiro Série C players
Brazilian expatriate footballers
Brazilian expatriate sportspeople in Morocco
Expatriate footballers in Morocco
Sportspeople from Recife